Philippe Harache (born 12 April 1954, at Orbec), is a French aerospace engineer and businessman. He is the former deputy CEO of Eurocopter.

Biography 
A graduate of the Institut polytechnique des sciences avancées (1976), Sorbonne Graduate Business School, INSEAD and Harvard Business School, Philippe Harache started his career in 1978 at the Helicopter department of Aérospatiale. 
Then, he moved to Asia: Hong Kong in 1980, Singapore in 1982 where he was CEO of Samaero, a subsidiary of Aérospatiale.
In 1992, he became chief of staff of the CEO of Eurocopter and in 1993 deputy CEO of Eurocopter Holdings. In 1994, he was nominated CEO of Eurocopter International.

He became deputy CEO of Eurocopter in 2001. He retired in 2010 with the nomination of his successor, Christian Gras.

Since 2002, he was also foreign trade advisers of France.

Bibliography 
 Académie nationale de l'air et de l'espace and Lucien Robineau, Les français du ciel, dictionnaire historique, Le Cherche midi, June 2005, 782 p., Harache, Philippe

Awards 
 Official of the Order of Military Merit (Brazil)
 Chevaliers of the Légion d'honneur

References 

1954 births
Living people
French businesspeople
Institut Polytechnique des Sciences Avancées alumni
Harvard Business School alumni
INSEAD alumni
Aviation in France
Chevaliers of the Légion d'honneur
Recipients of the Order of Military Merit (Brazil)
French aerospace engineers